Rhymes with Banana is a 2012 American comedy film directed by Peter Hutchings and Joseph Muszynski and starring Zosia Mamet, Jee Young Han and Paul Iacono.

Cast
Zosia Mamet as Z
Jee Young Han as G
Paul Iacono as Ted
Jaleel White as J
Justine Cotsonas as Veronika
Deborah Rush as Jane

References

External links
 
 

American comedy films
2012 comedy films
2012 films
2010s English-language films
Films directed by Peter Hutchings
2012 directorial debut films
2010s American films